Anton Bahdanaw (born 27 April 2001) is a Belarusian professional footballer who plays for Rogachev.

References

External links 
 
 

2000 births
Living people
People from Smalyavichy
Sportspeople from Minsk Region
Belarusian footballers
Belarus youth international footballers
Association football midfielders
FC Torpedo-BelAZ Zhodino players
FC Smolevichi players
FC Sputnik Rechitsa players
FC Dnepr Rogachev players